1. FC Nürnberg played the 1967–68 season in the Fußball-Bundesliga.

Match results

Legend

Bundesliga

DFB-Pokal

Player details

Transfers

In

Out

See also
1967–68 Fußball-Bundesliga

Notes

References

1. FC Nürnberg seasons
Nurnberg
German football championship-winning seasons